Ichoca Municipality is the fifth municipal section of the Inquisivi Province in the  La Paz Department, Bolivia. Its seat is Ichoca.

See also 
 Inka Laqaya
 Jach'a Jawira
 Waña Quta
 Wisk'achani

References 

 Instituto Nacional de Estadistica de Bolivia

Municipalities of La Paz Department (Bolivia)